Guanche may refer to:

Guanches, the indigenous people of the Canary Islands
Guanche language, an extinct Berber language, spoken by the Guanches until the 16th or 17th century
Conus guanche, a sea snail of family Conidae

Language and nationality disambiguation pages